Polymastia aurantia is a species of sea sponge belonging to the family Polymastiidae. It is found in intertidal habitats including tide pools in the vicinity of Auckland, New Zealand.

This is a thickly encrusting sponge with a soft, fleshy texture, growing in patches up to 18 cm across. The outer layer is bright orange with a yellowish-brown interior. The surface is marked with widely spaced papillae: When the sponge is in a location affected by wave action, the papillae are located on distinct lamellae running in a single direction over the whole surface of the sponge.

References

aurantia
Sponges of New Zealand
Animals described in 1997
Taxa named by Patricia Bergquist
Taxa named by Michelle Kelly (marine scientist)